The Portuguese Women's Basketball Supercup is the Final between winner Championship and winner/finalist of the Portuguese Cup, which is also called (Portuguese: "Supertaça de Portugal de Basquetebol Feminino") and it is organized by the FPB (Portuguese: Federação Portuguesa de Basquetebol)

Portuguese Supercup winners

References

External links
 History 1
 History 2

Port
Women's basketball cup competitions in Portugal